Blue Lake is the name of one of two tiny crater lakes on Raoul Island in New Zealand's Kermadec Islands, the other being Green Lake. It covers an area of about 0.5 km2.

Landforms of the Kermadec Islands
Lakes of the New Zealand outlying islands
Volcanic crater lakes
Raoul Island